The Darul Ehsan Mosque is the first mosque in Subang Jaya, Selangor, Malaysia. It is located in SS 15 adjacent to the Subang Parade shopping complex. It was constructed between 1983 and 1985 to serve the then newly built township of Subang Jaya. This mosque was officially opened on 13 September 1985 by Almarhum Sultan Salahuddin Abdul Aziz Shah of Selangor in conjunction of the 25th Silver Jubilee of his reign.

See also
 Islam in Malaysia

Mosques in Selangor
1985 establishments in Malaysia
Mosques completed in 1985